Bolnore may refer to:

Bolnore Village, a new village built close to the West Sussex town of Haywards Heath in the Mid Sussex District of Sussex County, England
Kleinwort baronets, of Bolnore, Sussex County, England, a title in the Baronetage of the United Kingdom